An opera house is a theatre building used for performances of opera. It usually includes a stage, an orchestra pit, audience seating, and backstage facilities for costumes and building sets.

While some venues are constructed specifically for operas, other opera houses are part of larger performing arts centers. Indeed, the term opera house is often used as a term of prestige for any large performing-arts center.

History 

In the 17th and 18th centuries, opera houses were often financed by rulers, nobles, and wealthy people who used patronage of the arts to endorse their political ambition and social position.  With the rise of bourgeois and capitalist social forms in the 19th century, European culture moved away from its patronage system to a publicly supported system.

Early United States opera houses served a variety of functions in towns and cities, hosting community dances, fairs, plays, and vaudeville shows as well as operas and other musical events. In the 2000s, most opera and theatre companies are supported by funds from a combination of government and institutional grants, ticket sales, and private donations.

Other uses of the term 
In the 19th-century United States, many theaters were given the name "opera house," even ones where opera was seldom if ever performed. Opera was viewed as a more respectable art form than theater; calling a local theater an "opera house" therefore served to elevate it and overcome objections from those who found the theater morally objectionable.

Gallery

See also 
 List of opera houses
 List of opera festivals
 List of concert halls
 List of buildings

References 
Notes

Sources
 Allison, John (ed.), Great Opera Houses of the World, supplement to Opera Magazine, London 2003
 Beauvert, Thierry, Opera Houses of the World, The Vendome Press, New York, 1995. 
 Beranek, Leo. Concert Halls and Opera Houses: Music, Acoustics, and Architecture, New York: Springer, 2004. 
 Hughes, Spike.  Great Opera Houses; A Traveller's Guide to Their History and Traditions, London: Weidenfeld & Nicolson, 1956. 
 Kaldor, Andras. Great Opera Houses (Masterpieces of Architecture) Antique Collectors Club, 2002.   
 Lynn, Karyl Charna, Opera: the Guide to Western Europe's Great Houses, Santa Fe, New Mexico: John Muir Publications, 1991. 
 Lynn, Karyl Charna, Italian Opera Houses and Festivals, Lanham, Maryland: The Scarecrow Press, Inc., 2005. 
 Plantamura, Carol, The Opera Lover's Guide to Europe, Citadel Press, 1996, 
 Sicca, Luigi Maria, "The management of opera houses: The Italian experience of the Enti Autonomi", Taylor & Francis, International Journal of Cultural Policy, 1997,

External links

"The Layout of a Traditional Opera House" on h2g2
"Great Opera Houses of the World" on h2g2
Vintage postcard images of opera theaters from Historic Opera
"History of Opera" on HistoryWorld

 
Opera terminology
Opera history
Theatres
Italian inventions